Isaac Gerald Mattson (born July 14, 1995) is an American professional baseball pitcher who is currently a free agent. He has played in Major League Baseball (MLB) for the Baltimore Orioles.

Amateur career
Mattson attended Harbor Creek High School in Harborcreek, Pennsylvania, where he played both baseball and basketball. In 2014, his senior year, he went 6–0 with a 0.67 ERA along with batting .531. He was not drafted out of high school in the 2014 Major League Baseball draft and enrolled at the University of Pittsburgh where he played college baseball.

In 2015, as a freshman at Pitt, Mattson appeared in 22 games, going 1–1 with a 3.82 ERA, and in 2016, his sophomore season, he pitched 34 innings in relief, compiling a 2–0 record with a 3.71 ERA. After his sophomore year, he played for the Chatham Anglers of the Cape Cod Baseball League and was named an all-star. In 2017, as a junior, he pitched 31 innings out of the bullpen, going 1–0 with a 2.87 ERA, striking out 41.

Professional career

Los Angeles Angels organization
After the season, Mattson was drafted by the Los Angeles Angels in the 19th round of the 2017 Major League Baseball draft.

After signing, Mattson made his professional debut with the Arizona League Angels before being promoted to the Orem Owlz, where he was named an All-Star. In  innings between the two clubs, he went 1–0 with a 1.44 ERA. In 2018, he played for the Burlington Bees and the Inland Empire 66ers, going 7–4 with a 3.82 ERA in 25 games (11 starts), and in 2019, he began the year with the 66ers before being promoted to the Mobile BayBears in May. In August, he was promoted to the Salt Lake Bees. Over 37 relief appearances between the three clubs, Mattson pitched to a 6–3 record with a 2.33 ERA, striking out 110 over  innings. He was selected to play in the Arizona Fall League for the Mesa Solar Sox following the season.

Baltimore Orioles
On December 4, 2019, Mattson (alongside Zach Peek, Kyle Bradish, and Kyle Brnovich) was traded to the Baltimore Orioles in exchange for Dylan Bundy. He did not play a minor league game in 2020 due to the cancellation of the minor league season caused by the COVID-19 pandemic.

On November 20, 2020, Mattson was added to the 40-man roster. On May 3, 2021, Mattson was promoted to the major leagues for the first time. Mattson made his major league debut on May 7, pitching 2/3 of an inning and allowing one run on a Marwin González RBI double. 
He was optioned to the Triple-A Norfolk Tides the following day. On June 30, Mattson was recalled by the Orioles. He recorded his first career strikeout on July 3, striking out Los Angeles Angels infielder David Fletcher. Over 4 appearances for the Orioles in 2021, Matson posted a 6.23 ERA with 3 strikeouts.

On April 8, 2022, Mattson was outrighted to Triple-A Norfolk. On July 18, the Orioles released Mattson from the organization.

Washington Wild Things
Following Mattson's release from by Orioles, he signed with the Washington Wild Things of the Frontier League. On December 5, 2022, Mattson was released by the Wild Things by having his contract option declined.

References

External links

1995 births
Living people
Arizona League Angels players
Baltimore Orioles players
Baseball players from Pennsylvania
Burlington Bees players
Chatham Anglers players
Inland Empire 66ers of San Bernardino players
Major League Baseball pitchers
Mesa Solar Sox players
Mobile BayBears players
Orem Owlz players
Pittsburgh Panthers baseball players
Salt Lake Bees players
Sportspeople from Erie, Pennsylvania
Norfolk Tides players
Washington Wild Things players